Patrick Martin "Paddy" Mulligan (born 17 March 1945 in Dublin) is an Irish retired footballer who played mainly as a right-back.

Mulligan started his senior career playing for Bohemians in 1963. However, after only two games he signed for Shamrock Rovers in December 1963. He made his competitive debut in a 7–1 win over Bohemians on 26 January 1964 and scored his first goal for the Hoops on 23 August 1964 in a 4–0 League of Ireland Shield win over his old club.

He won the FAI Cup in 1965, 1966, 1967 and 1969. During the 1963–64 season he was part of the side which won seven trophies. He represented Rovers in European competition 10 times. In the summer of 1967 he was part of the Rovers team that represented Boston in the United Soccer Association league. In 1968, they sent him on loan to the Boston Beacons of the North American Soccer League.

On 22 October 1969, Mulligan signed for English club Chelsea for £17,500. He featured in Chelsea's UEFA Cup Winners' Cup success in 1971, making a late substitute appearance in the first final against Real Madrid in Athens. He also played in Chelsea's League Cup final against Stoke City a year later, though they lost 2–1 at Wembley.

Mulligan left Chelsea in 1972 for Crystal Palace. He stayed with the South London club for three years (his personal highlight was scoring two goals in the famous 5–0 victory over Manchester United in 1972). He signed for West Brom after his spell at CPFC. Mulligan re-joined Shamrock Rovers in 1979, making his final appearance on 24 February 1980. He had his testimonial in August 1980. He then joined Panathinaikos as assistant manager 

During his time at Rovers he won 10 caps for the Irish national team, including three as captain, one under-23 cap and six Inter league caps. Overall, he won 50 caps for his country.

Mulligan managed League of Ireland sides Galway United (during the 1983–84 season) and Shelbourne during the first half of the 1985–86 season. He also applied to manage the Irish national team, but lost out to Eoin Hand by a single vote. One FAI committee member later said he had voted against Mulligan because he thought Mulligan had thrown a bun at him on a past away trip.

Mulligan occasionally appears as a soccer analyst on Irish television channel TV3 as well as the website of radio station Newstalk.

Honours

 FAI Cup: 4
 Shamrock Rovers 1965, 1966, 1967, 1969
  Top Four Cup
 Shamrock Rovers 1966
  Dublin City Cup
 Shamrock Rovers 1966/67
Leinster Senior Cup
  Shamrock Rovers – 1968/69
UEFA Cup Winners' Cup: 1
 Chelsea –  1970–71

References

Sources
 The Hoops by Paul Doolan and Robert Goggins

Shamrock Rovers F.C. players
Shamrock Rovers F.C. guest players
1945 births
Living people
Bohemian F.C. players
Galway United F.C. (1937–2011) players
Chelsea F.C. players
Crystal Palace F.C. players
West Bromwich Albion F.C. players
League of Ireland players
League of Ireland managers
Association footballers from Dublin (city)
Republic of Ireland association footballers
Republic of Ireland football managers
Republic of Ireland international footballers
Republic of Ireland under-23 international footballers
Shelbourne F.C. managers
Galway United F.C. managers
Home Farm F.C. players
Boston Rovers players
United Soccer Association players
North American Soccer League (1968–1984) players
Republic of Ireland expatriate association footballers
Expatriate soccer players in the United States
Irish expatriate sportspeople in the United States
Boston Beacons players
League of Ireland XI players
Association football defenders